The 1992 Nigerian Senate election in Adamawa State was held on July 4, 1992, to elect members of the Nigerian Senate to represent Adamawa State. Paul Wampana Vimtim representing Adamawa North, Hamman Bello Mohammed representing Adamawa Central and Manasa T. B. Daniel representing Adamawa South all won on the platform of the National Republican Convention.

Overview

Summary

Results

Adamawa North 
The election was won by Paul Wampana Vimtim of the National Republican Convention.

Adamawa Central 
The election was won by Hamman Bello Mohammed of the National Republican Convention.

Adamawa South 
The election was won by Manasa T. B. Daniel of the National Republican Convention.

References 

Adam
Adamawa State Senate elections
July 1992 events in Nigeria